Maackia amurensis, commonly known as the Amur maackia, is a species of tree in the family Fabaceae that can grow 15 metres (49 ft) tall. The species epithet and common names are from the Amur River region, where the tree originated; it occurs in northeastern China, Korea, and Russia.

Only reaching about 15 feet (4.6 m) tall in the American midwest, Amur maackia tolerates severe dryness, cold and heavy soils. More interesting than the summer flowers are the unfolding buds in spring which appear silvery and showy like flowers with frost on them.

Named for Karlovich Maack (Richard Maack), a 19th-century Siberian explorer who discovered the tree in the Amur River region on the border between Siberia and China.

Chemistry
The isoflavones daidzein, retusin, genistein and formononetin and the pterocarpans maackiain and medicarpin can be found in M. amurensis cell cultures.

The quinolizidine alkaloids tetrahydroleontidine and 11-epileontidane have been isolated from the species (their only natural source so far).

Gallery

References

External links 
 Maackia amurensis Diagnostic photographs and information, Morton Arboretum acc. 147-71-5

Sophoreae
Trees of China
Trees of Korea
Trees of Russia
Plants described in 1856